Life in the Jungle is a studio album by the Shadows released in 1982. It was packaged with the bonus album Live at Abbey Road (also released for the first time in this package). The album package reached number 24 on the UK Album Charts.

Track listing

Personnel

The Shadows are:
 Hank Marvin - Guitars & Vocals
 Bruce Welch - Guitars & Vocals
 Brian Bennett - Drums
With
 Alan Jones - Bass
 Cliff Hall - Keyboards

Recorded by Dick Plant at Honeyhill Studios & Nivram Studios

All recordings: 1982 Roll Over Records Ltd

References

The Shadows albums
1982 albums